Mushin may refer to:

Mushin (mental state), in martial arts
Mushin, Lagos